T'Chaka is a fictional character appearing in American comic books published by Marvel Comics. He is the father of T'Challa and Shuri. He was the king of Wakanda and Black Panther before T'Challa; he inherited both titles following the death of his father, T'Chanda aka Azzuri the Wise.

John Kani portrayed the character in the Marvel Cinematic Universe films Captain America: Civil War (2016) and Black Panther (2018) while Kani's son Atandwa portrayed a younger version of the character. Kani returned to voice alternate versions of the character in the animated Disney+ series What If...? (2021).

Publication history

T'Chaka first appeared in Fantastic Four #53 (1966) and was created by Stan Lee and Jack Kirby.

Fictional character biography
T'Chaka is the Chieftain of Wakanda who ascended to the throne after the death of his father King T"Chanda aka Azzuri the Wise. During 1941 at the time of World War II, Captain America traveled to Wakanda where he met T'Chaka. Together, they assisted Sgt. Fury and His Howling Commandos against Red Skull and Baron Strucker. T'Chaka and Captain America also faced threats from Master Man, Warrior Woman, and Armless Tiger Man when they partook in an all-out attack on Wakanda. Armless Tiger Man even threatened to kill T'Chaka if he didn't have Wakanda's forces surrender. Outmanned and outgunned, T'Chaka and Captain America held their own against Master Man, Warrior Woman, Armless Tiger Man, White Gorilla, and Red Skull.

Sometime later, Captain America visited Wakanda and gave T'Chaka his triangle shield in exchange for some Vibranium. When he got engaged to his first wife N'Yami, T'Chaka adopted Hunter who T'Chaka groomed as the heir to the throne until the day N'Yami gave birth to T'Challa and then died from childbirth. Shortly after T'Challa's birth, his brother Jakarra was born. T'Chaka later married Ramonda who gave birth to Shuri.

In the fall of 1959, T'Chaka was kidnapped by Geoffrey Sydenham of the organization ICON. This was part of ICON's plan to weaken Wakanda and pillage the technology there. Nick Fury's Avengers stumbled onto this plot where they ended up fighting ICON. It was discovered that T'Chaka was being held in a castle within Latveria where Dum Dum Dugan and Eric Koenig then rescued him. T'Chaka was safely returned to Wakanda.

Many years later, Wakanda had their technology coveted as they had no ties to any other countries. Ulysses Klaw and his mercenaries invaded Wakanda and demanded that T'Chaka give them their vibranium. When T'Chaka refused to give them vibranium, Klaw had his mercenaries kill T'Chaka. This angered T'Challa who used one of the mercenaries' weapons to destroy their camp and rendered Ulysses Klaw's right hand useless.

The history of T'Chaka's death was retconned in the third volume of the Black Panther comics in which the leaders of some different countries had been unable to negotiate with T'Chaka into giving them some Vibranium. After that happened, they hired Ulysses Klaw. Upon emerging from the floor of T'Chaka's palace, Ulysses Klaw killed T'Chaka. This enraged T'Challa who wounded and drove away Ulysses Klaw. Due to the death of T'Chaka, T'Challa's uncle S'Yan ruled Wakanda in T'Chaka's place until the day when T'Challa was at the right age to be sworn in as the new Chieftain of Wakanda.

Powers and abilities
Upon eating a special heart-shaped herb, his natural powers are enhanced. T'Chaka possesses superhuman strength, speed, agility, stamina, durability, reflexes, and senses. He is also an expert martial artist, a known weapons expert, a skilled marksman, an expert tracker and hunter, and a master tactician outside of his mutant powers.

Weaknesses 
T'Chaka's heightened senses cause bright lights, loud noises, & strong smells to potentially overwhelm him.

Other versions

Ultimate Marvel
In the Ultimate Marvel universe, T'Chaka's full name was T'Chaka Udaku. In addition to T'Challa, he was also the father of M'Baku.

In other media

Television
 T'Chaka appears in the Fantastic Four episode "Panther's Prey", voiced by Beau Weaver. Just like the comics, he is killed by Klaw.
 T'Chaka appears in episode 3 of Black Panther, voiced by Jonathan Adams. He is seen in a flashback where he was killed by Klaw.
 T'Chaka is referenced in the Iron Man: Armored Adventures episode "Panther's Prey". Black Panther mentions to Iron Man that Moses Magnum was responsible for killing T'Chaka.
 T'Chaka appears in The Avengers: Earth's Mightiest Heroes episode "The Man in the Ant-Hill", voiced by Hakeem Kae-Kazim. He is challenged to the throne of Wakanda by Man-Ape. With some unseen assistance from Klaw, T'Chaka is killed by Man-Ape causing T'Challa to become the next Black Panther and seek help to take back Wakanda.
 T'Chaka appears in Avengers Assemble, voiced by Keith David as an adult and by James C. Mathis III as a young boy. Outside of the fact that T'Chaka is dead when he is alluded to in the episode "Panther's Rage", Captain America had to explain to T'Challa that his grandfather gave Howard Stark the Vibranium needed to make Captain America's shield. In the episode "T'Chanda", a younger T'Chaka was seen when Black Panther uses the Crown to experience a flashback that involved his grandfather T'Chanda. After a mission with Captain America and Peggy Carter, T'Chanda explains to his son that he saved Yemandi's Box from falling into the hands of the Shadow Council as T'Chaka witnesses T'Chanda do preparations to keep the Shadow Council from obtaining it. In the episode "Bashenga", Black Panther ends up in the world within the Crown and attacked by Bask until T'Chaka appears to lead him away. By the time Black Panther catches up to his father, T'Chaka disappears and Captain America appears in his place.

Film
T'Chaka appears in Ultimate Avengers II, voiced by Dave Fennoy. He begins the film as the Black Panther while having the title's ability to turn into a humanoid black panther. When Wakanda is invaded by Chitauri, T'Chaka attacks them to drive them off. He is ambushed by Nazi-disguised Chitauri general Herr Kleiser who stabs him multiple times. T'Chaka defeats and drives off Kleiser, but succumbs to his wounds. After his death, T'Challa ascends to the throne and mantle of the Black Panther.

Marvel Cinematic Universe
John Kani portrays T'Chaka in the Marvel Cinematic Universe.
He is first mentioned in Avengers: Age of Ultron on Ulysses Klaue's S.H.I.E.L.D. file, which is read by the Avengers.
He first physically appears in Captain America: Civil War. During a meeting ratifying the Sokovian Accords at the Vienna International Center, T'Chaka is killed by an explosion. The Winter Soldier was originally believed to be behind the attack, but it was later discovered that he was framed by Helmut Zemo.
Kani reprises his role as T'Chaka in 2018's Black Panther while his son Atandwa Kani portrays a young T'Chaka in the same film. In the film's prologue, T'Chaka learned his brother N'Jobu (instead of S'Yan) was plotting acts of open insurrection with plans to have Wakanda take a more aggressive foreign policy to fight the social injustice he witnessed in his assigned country. T'Chaka confronted N'Jobu. When N'Jobu attacked, he was killed by T'Chaka in defense of Zuri (who was acting as a spy the whole time). Distressed at this act and concerned about maintaining Wakanda's security above all else, T'Chaka chose to promptly return to his nation and left Erik abandoned as a child orphan. T'Challa would learn of this act and the resulting cover-up by his late father. While visiting the ancestor lands, T'Challa learned of T'Chaka's actions and tells him and the previous Black Panthers before him that he will lead Wakanda in a manner differently to them for the purpose of correcting T'Chaka's past mistakes.
Kani voices alternate versions of T'Chaka in the Disney+ animated series What If...? episodes "What If... T'Challa Became a Star-Lord?" and "What If... Killmonger Rescued Tony Stark?".

Video games
 T'Chaka is referenced in Marvel: Ultimate Alliance. When the players ask Black Panther about his history, he mentions how his father was killed by Klaw.

References

External links
 T'Chaka at Marvel Wiki
 T'Chaka at Comic Vine

Black characters in films
African superheroes
Characters created by Jack Kirby
Characters created by Stan Lee
Comics characters introduced in 1966
Fictional characters with superhuman durability or invulnerability
Fictional characters with superhuman senses
Fictional World War II veterans
Male characters in film
Marvel Comics characters who can move at superhuman speeds
Marvel Comics characters with accelerated healing
Marvel Comics characters with superhuman strength
Marvel Comics male superheroes
Jungle superheroes
Wakandans